Arun is a local government district in West Sussex, England. It contains the towns of Arundel, Bognor Regis and Littlehampton, and takes its name from the River Arun, which runs through the centre of the district.

History
Arun was formed on 1 April 1974, under the Local Government Act 1972, merging the Urban Districts of Bognor Regis and Littlehampton, the municipal borough of Arundel and parts of Chichester and Worthing Rural Districts.

Governance

The council was under the control of the Conservative Party since the district's formation in 1973 until 2019 where it fell into no overall control and the Liberal Democrats became the largest group. The last elections to the council were held on 2 May 2019. Although the 2019 local elections returned a result meaning that the council was in No overall control, the Liberal Democrats formed a new administration led by Cllr James Walsh.

Following those elections, the composition of the council was as follows:

In the months following the 2019 election, two members of the Liberal Democrats resigned from the party and then sat as Independents. In April 2020 a Liberal Democrat member died, triggering a by-election, however the coronavirus pandemic this was delayed until 6 May 2021. Another Liberal Democrat councillor left their group to become Independent in September 2020, and a further Liberal Democrat resigned their seat in March 2021 with a by-election on 6 May 2021.

In the two by-elections, the Conservative gained both seats from the Liberal Democrats. Another councillor defected from the Liberal Democrats which meant that Cllr Shaun Gunner as Leader of the Conservative Group was able to form a new administration in May 2021.

Following the death of a Conservative councillor in July 2022, the current composition is as follows:

Wards

Arun District Council is a non-metropolitan district council formed of 54 councillors from across the following 23 wards:

Civil parishes
The following 31 civil parishes are located within the district:

Geography
Arun District occupies the central southern area of West Sussex, and is bordered by Chichester District to the west, Horsham District to the north and Worthing borough and Adur District to the east. The district is bisected by the River Arun, and is divided between a broad rural area in the north of the district that contains Arundel and a host of small villages, part of which sits within the South Downs National Park, and an urban coastal strip that includes Bognor Regis and Littlehampton.

Economy
Although set within the typically prosperous county of West Sussex, much of Bognor Regis and Littlehampton are ranked amongst the 20% most deprived areas in the UK as a whole on the Index of Multiple Deprivation.
The district contains a large tourism sector, attracting visitors to the South Downs in the north, and the beaches of Bognor Regis and Littlehampton in the south, the latter of which holds a prestigious Blue Flag Award. Consequently, the district suffers from high amounts of seasonal employment, with the Office for National Statistics estimating that nearly 11% of the population of Arun is employed in the tourism sector, compared to 8% nationally, whilst 28% of people work in the distribution, hotels and restaurants sector, compared to just 23% nationally. Arun also has a higher number of public sector workers than either the regional or national average, and a significantly smaller finance and IT sector than the rest of the South East and wider UK.

Awards
In 2008, the district council won an Ashden Award for their work on energy efficiency.

The District Council is regularly awarded the prestigious Green Flag Award which is given for excellent parks. Currently five parks in the District are recognised as meeting the requirements of Green Flag; Mewsbrook Park, Hotham Park, Norfolk Gardens, Old Rectory Gardens and Marine Park Gardens.

Football clubs
Arundel F.C.
Bognor Regis Town F.C.
Clymping F.C.
East Preston F.C.
Littlehampton Town F.C.
Pagham F.C.
Rustington F.C.
Wick F.C.

See also
List of places of worship in Arun

References 

 
Non-metropolitan districts of West Sussex